Tamnagar is a former Village Development Committee (VDC) and now part of Butwal Sub-Metropolitan municipality in Rupandehi District in Lumbini Province of southern Nepal. At the time of the 1991 Nepal census it had a population of 5786 people living in 1129 individual households.

References

Populated places in Rupandehi District